The Brittonic languages (also Brythonic or British Celtic; ;) form one of the two branches of the Insular Celtic language family; the other is Goidelic. It comprises the extant languages Breton, Cornish, and Welsh. The name Brythonic was derived by Welsh Celticist John Rhys from the Welsh word , meaning Ancient Britons as opposed to an Anglo-Saxon or Gael.

The Brittonic languages derive from the Common Brittonic language, spoken throughout Great Britain during the Iron Age and Roman period. In the 5th and 6th centuries emigrating Britons also took Brittonic speech to the continent, most significantly in Brittany and Britonia. During the next few centuries the language began to split into several dialects, eventually evolving into Welsh, Cornish, Breton, Cumbric, and probably Pictish. Welsh and Breton continue to be spoken as native languages, while a revival in Cornish has led to an increase in speakers of that language. Cumbric and Pictish are extinct, having been replaced by Goidelic and Anglic speech. The Isle of Man and Orkney may also have originally spoken a Brittonic language, but this was later supplanted by Goidelic on the Isle of Man and Norse on Orkney.

Name
The names "Brittonic" and "Brythonic" are scholarly conventions referring to the Celtic languages of Britain and to the ancestral language they originated from, designated Common Brittonic, in contrast to the Goidelic languages originating in Ireland. Both were created in the 19th century to avoid the ambiguity of earlier terms such as "British" and "Cymric". "Brythonic" was coined in 1879 by the Celticist John Rhys from the Welsh word . "Brittonic", derived from "Briton" and also earlier spelled "Britonic" and "Britonnic", emerged later in the 19th century. It became more prominent through the 20th century, and was used in Kenneth H. Jackson's highly influential 1953 work on the topic, Language and History in Early Britain. Jackson noted that by that time "Brythonic" had become a dated term, and that "of late there has been an increasing tendency to use Brittonic instead." Today, "Brittonic" often replaces "Brythonic" in the literature. Rudolf Thurneysen used "Britannic" in his influential A Grammar of Old Irish, although this never became popular among subsequent scholars.

Some writers use "British" for the language and its descendants, although, due to the risk of confusion, others avoid it or use it only in a restricted sense. Jackson, and later John T. Koch, use "British" only for the early phase of the Common Brittonic language.

However, subsequent writers have tended to follow Jackson's scheme, rendering this use obsolete.

Evidence
Knowledge of the Brittonic languages comes from a variety of sources. The early language's information is obtained from coins, inscriptions, and comments by classical writers as well as place names and personal names recorded by them. For later languages, there is information from medieval writers and modern native speakers, together with place names. The names recorded in the Roman period are given in Rivet and Smith.

Characteristics
The Brittonic branch is also referred to as P-Celtic because linguistic reconstruction of the Brittonic reflex of the Proto-Indo-European phoneme * is p as opposed to Goidelic k. Such nomenclature usually implies acceptance of the P-Celtic and Q-Celtic hypothesis rather than the Insular Celtic hypothesis because the term includes certain Continental Celtic languages as well. (For a discussion, see Celtic languages.)

Other major characteristics include:
 The retention of the Proto-Celtic sequences am and an, which mostly result from the Proto-Indo-European syllabic nasals.
 Celtic  (written u in Latin texts and ou in Greek) became gw- in initial position, -w- internally, whereas in Gaelic it is f- in initial position and disappears internally:
 Proto-Celtic  'white, fair' became Welsh  (masculine),  (feminine), Cornish , Breton . Contrast Irish  'fair'.
 Proto-Celtic  'servant, young man' became Welsh, Cornish and Breton . Contrast Middle Irish .
Initial s-:
 Initial s- followed by a vowel was changed to h-:
 Welsh  'old',  'long',  'similar'
 Breton  'ancient',  'long',  'similar'
 Cornish  'ancient',  'long',  'similar'
 Contrast Irish  'old',  'long',  'similarity'
 Initial s- was lost before ,  and :
  became Welsh , Cornish  and Breton  'smooth'. Contrast Irish  'smooth, slimy'
  became Welsh , Cornish , and Breton  'marrow'. Contrast Irish 
 The initial clusters sp-, sr-, sw- became f-, fr-, chw-:
  became Welsh  'ankle', Cornish  'shank, lower leg' and Breton  'ankle'. Contrast Old Irish  'heel, ankle'
  'nostril' became Welsh , Cornish  and Breton . Contrast Irish 
  'you' (plural) became Welsh , Cornish  and Breton . Contrast Old Irish 
Lenition:
 Voiceless plosives become voiced plosives in intervocalic position.
 d , g , b 
 Welsh  ,  
 Cornish  ,  
Voiceless spirants:
 Geminated voiceless plosives transformed into spirants;  (pp),  (cc),  (tt) became  (later ),  (ch/c'h),  (th/zh) before a vowel or liquid:
  > Breton , Cornish , Welsh , 'tree trunk'
  > Breton , Cornish , Welsh , 'cat' vs. Irish 
  > Breton , Cornish , Welsh , 'cheek'
 Voiceless stops become spirants after liquids:
  'bear' > Welsh/Cornish , Breton , compare Old Irish 
Nasal assimilation:
 Voiced stops were assimilated to a preceding nasal:
 Brittonic retains original nasals before -t and -k, whereas Goidelic alters -nt to -d, and -nk to -g:
 Breton  'hundred' vs. Irish , Breton  (personification of) Death, Irish  'die'

Classification
The family tree of the Brittonic languages is as follows:

Common Brittonic ancestral to:
Western Brittonic languages ancestral to:
Cumbric
Welsh
Southwestern Brittonic languages ancestral to:
Cornish
Breton

Brittonic languages in use today are Welsh, Cornish and Breton. Welsh and Breton have been spoken continuously since they formed. For all practical purposes Cornish died out during the 18th or 19th century, but a revival movement has more recently created small numbers of new speakers. Also notable are the extinct language Cumbric, and possibly the extinct Pictish. One view, advanced in the 1950s and based on apparently unintelligible ogham inscriptions, was that the Picts may have also used a non-Indo-European language. This view, while attracting broad popular appeal, has virtually no following in contemporary linguistic scholarship.

History and origins

The modern Brittonic languages are generally considered to all derive from a common ancestral language termed Brittonic, British, Common Brittonic, Old Brittonic or Proto-Brittonic, which is thought to have developed from Proto-Celtic or early Insular Celtic by the 6th century BC.

A major archaeogenetics study uncovered a migration into southern Britain in the middle to late Bronze Age, during the 500-year period 1,300–800 BC. The newcomers were genetically most similar to ancient individuals from Gaul. During 1,000–875 BC, their genetic markers swiftly spread through southern Britain, but not northern Britain. The authors describe this as a "plausible vector for the spread of early Celtic languages into Britain". There was much less inward migration during the Iron Age, so it is likely that Celtic reached Britain before then. Barry Cunliffe suggests that a Goidelic branch of Celtic may already have been spoken in Britain, but that this middle Bronze Age migration would have introduced the Brittonic branch.

Brittonic languages were probably spoken before the Roman invasion throughout most of Great Britain, though the Isle of Man later had a Goidelic language, Manx. During the period of the Roman occupation of what is now England and Wales (AD 43 to c. 410), Common Brittonic borrowed a large stock of Latin words, both for concepts unfamiliar in the pre-urban society of Celtic Britain such as urbanization and new tactics of warfare as well as for rather more mundane words which displaced native terms (most notably, the word for "fish" in all the Brittonic languages derives from the Latin piscis rather than the native *ēskos - which may survive, however, in the Welsh name of the River Usk). Approximately 800 of these Latin loan-words have survived in the three modern Brittonic languages. Pictish may have resisted Latin influence to a greater extent than the other Brittonic languages.

It is probable that at the start of the Post-Roman period Common Brittonic was differentiated into at least two major dialect groups – Southwestern and Western (also we may posit additional dialects, such as Eastern Brittonic, spoken in what is now the East of England, which have left little or no evidence). Between the end of the Roman occupation and the mid 6th century the two dialects began to diverge into recognizably separate varieties, the Western into Cumbric and Welsh and the Southwestern into Cornish and its closely related sister language Breton, which was carried to continental Armorica. Jackson showed that a few of the dialect distinctions between West and Southwest Brittonic go back a long way. New divergencies began around AD 500 but other changes that were shared occurred in the 6th century. Other common changes occurred in the 7th century onward and are possibly due to inherent tendencies. Thus the concept of a Common Brittonic language ends by AD 600. Substantial numbers of Britons certainly remained in the expanding area controlled by Anglo-Saxons, but over the fifth and sixth centuries they mostly adopted the English language.

Decline 

The Brittonic languages spoken in what is now Scotland, the Isle of Man and what is now England began to be displaced in the 5th century through the settlement of Irish-speaking Gaels and Germanic peoples. Henry of Huntingdon wrote that Pictish was "no longer spoken" in c.1129.

The displacement of the languages of Brittonic descent was probably complete in all of Britain except Cornwall and Wales and the English counties bordering these areas such as Devon by the 11th century. Western Herefordshire continued to speak Welsh until the late nineteenth century, and isolated pockets of Shropshire speak Welsh today.

Sound changes 
The regular consonantal sound changes from Proto-Celtic to Welsh, Cornish, and Breton are summarised in the following table. Where the graphemes have a different value from the corresponding IPA symbols, the IPA equivalent is indicated between slashes. V represents a vowel; C represents a consonant.

Remnants in England, Scotland and Ireland

Place names and river names

The principal legacy left behind in those territories from which the Brittonic languages were displaced is that of toponyms (place names) and hydronyms (names of rivers and other bodies of water). There are many Brittonic place names in lowland Scotland and in the parts of England where it is agreed that substantial Brittonic speakers remained (Brittonic names, apart from those of the former Romano-British towns, are scarce over most of England). Names derived (sometimes indirectly) from Brittonic include London, Penicuik, Perth, Aberdeen, York, Dorchester, Dover and Colchester. Brittonic elements found in England include bre- and bal- for hills, while some such as combe or coomb(e) for a small deep valley and tor for a hill are examples of Brittonic words that were borrowed into English. Others reflect the presence of Britons such as Dumbarton – from the Scottish Gaelic Dùn Breatainn meaning "Fort of the Britons", or Walton meaning a tun or settlement where the Wealh "Britons" still lived.

The number of Celtic river names in England generally increases from east to west, a map showing these being given by Jackson. These names include ones such as Avon, Chew, Frome, Axe, Brue and Exe, but also river names containing the elements "der-/dar-/dur-" and "-went" e.g. "Derwent, Darwen, Deer, Adur, Dour, Darent, Went". These names exhibit multiple different Celtic roots. One is *dubri- "water" [Bret. "dour", C. "dowr", W. "dŵr"], also found in the place-name "Dover" (attested in the Roman period as "Dubrīs"); this is the source of rivers named "Dour". Another is *deru̯o- "oak" or "true" [Bret. "derv", C. "derow", W. "derw"], coupled with 2 agent suffixes, *-ent- and *-iū; this is the origin of "Derwent", " Darent" and "Darwen" (attested in the Roman period as "Deru̯entiō"). The final root to be examined is "went". In Roman Britain, there were three tribal capitals named "U̯entā" (modern Winchester, Caerwent and Caistor St Edmunds), whose meaning was 'place, town'.

Brittonicisms in English

Some, including J. R. R. Tolkien, have argued that Celtic has acted as a substrate to English for both the lexicon and syntax. It is generally accepted that Brittonic effects on English are lexically few, aside from toponyms, consisting of a small number of domestic and geographical words, which 'may' include bin, brock, carr, comb, crag and tor. Another legacy may be the sheep-counting system Yan Tan Tethera in the north, in the traditionally Celtic areas of England such as Cumbria. Several Cornish mining words are still in use in English language mining terminology, such as costean, gunnies, and vug.

Those who argue against the theory of a more significant Brittonic influence than is widely accepted point out that many toponyms have no semantic continuation from the Brittonic language. A notable example is Avon which comes from the Celtic term for river abona or the Welsh term for river, afon, but was used by the English as a personal name. Likewise the River Ouse, Yorkshire contains the word usa which merely means 'water' and the name of the river Trent simply comes from the Welsh word for a trespasser (an over-flowing river).

It has been argued that the use of periphrastic constructions (using auxiliary verbs such as do and be in the continuous/progressive) in the English verb, which is more widespread than in the other Germanic languages, is traceable to Brittonic influence. Others, however, find this unlikely due to the fact that many of these forms are only attested in the later Middle English period; these scholars claim a native English development rather than Celtic influence. Ian G. Roberts postulates Northern Germanic influence, despite such constructions not existing in Norse. Literary Welsh has the simple present Caraf = I love and the present stative (al. continuous/progressive) Yr wyf yn caru = I am loving, where the Brittonic syntax is partly mirrored in English (Note that I am loving comes from older I am a-loving, from still older ich am on luvende  "I am in the process of loving"). In the Germanic sister languages of English there is only one form, for example ich liebe  in German, though in colloquial usage in some German dialects, a progressive aspect form has evolved which is formally similar to those found in Celtic languages, and somewhat less similar to the Modern English form, e.g. "I am working" is ich bin am Arbeiten, literally: "I am on the working". The same structure is also found in modern Dutch (ik ben aan het werk), alongside other structures (e.g. ik zit te werken, lit. "I sit to working"). These parallel developments suggest that the English progressive is not necessarily due to Celtic influence; moreover, the native English development of the structure can be traced over 1000 years and more of English literature.

Some researchers (Filppula et al., 2001) argue that other elements of English syntax reflect Brittonic influences. For instance, in English tag questions, the form of the tag depends on the verb form in the main statement (aren't I?, isn't he?, won't we? etc.). The German nicht wahr? and the French n'est-ce pas?, by contrast, are fixed forms which can be used with almost any main statement. It has been claimed that the English system has been borrowed from Brittonic, since Welsh tag questions vary in almost exactly the same way.

Brittonic effect on the Goidelic languages
Far more notable, but less well known, are Brittonic influences on Scottish Gaelic, though Scottish and Irish Gaelic, with their wider range of preposition-based periphrastic constructions, suggest that such constructions descend from their common Celtic heritage. Scottish Gaelic contains several P-Celtic loanwords, but, as there is a far greater overlap in terms of Celtic vocabulary, than with English, it is not always possible to disentangle P- and Q-Celtic words. However, some common words such as monadh = Welsh mynydd, Cumbric *monidh are particularly evident.

The Brittonic influence on Scots Gaelic is often indicated by considering Irish language usage, which is not likely to have been influenced so much by Brittonic. In particular, the word srath (anglicised as "Strath") is a native Goidelic word, but its usage appears to have been modified by the Brittonic cognate ystrad whose meaning is slightly different. The effect on Irish has been the loan from British of many Latin-derived words. This has been associated with the Christianisation of Ireland from Britain.

References

Notes

Sources
Aleini M (1996). Origini delle lingue d'Europa.
Dillon M and Chadwick N (1967). Celtic Realms.
Filppula, M., Klemola, J. and Pitkänen, H. (2001). The Celtic roots of English, Studies in languages, No. 37, University of Joensuu, Faculty of Humanities, .
Hawkes, J. (1973). The first great civilizations: life in Mesopotamia, the Indus Valley and Egypt, The history of human society series, London: Hutchinson, .
Jackson, K., (1994). Language and history in early Britain: a chronological survey of the Brittonic languages, 1st to 12th c. A. D, Celtic studies series, Dublin: Four Courts Press, .
Jackson, K. (1955), "The Pictish Language", in Wainwright, F.T., The Problem of the Picts, Edinburgh: Nelson, pp. 129–166
Rivet A and Smith C (1979). The Placenames of Roman Britain.
Schrijver, P. (1995), Studies in British Celtic Historical Phonology. Amsterdam: Rodopi. .
Willis, David. 2009. "Old and Middle Welsh". In Ball, Martin J., Müller, Nicole (ed). The Celtic Languages, 117–160, 2nd Edition. Routledge Language Family Series.New York: Routledge. .
Driscoll, S T 2011. Pictish archaeology: persistent problems and structural solutions. In Driscoll, S T, Geddes, J and Hall, M A (eds) Pictish Progress: new studies on northern Britain in the early Middle Ages, Leiden and Boston: Bril pp 245–279.

External links

Coates, Richard (2007) Invisible Britons: the view from linguistics. (archived)

 
Iron Age Britain
Ancient Britain